is a Japanese television drama produced by Shochiku. Adapted from the manga of the same name by Fumi Yoshinaga, the series premiered on April 5, 2019 on TV Tokyo.

Episode list

Season 1

Special

References

External links
 
 What Did You Eat Yesterday? official television drama website 

Lists of Japanese drama television series episodes